Floru may refer to:

 Floru, a village in Icoana Commune, Olt County, Romania